The Regina Station is a station on Line 2 of the Monterrey Metro. It is located along Alfonso Reyes Avenue where it is intersected by Juan Sánchez Azcona street.

This station is three blocks away from the Monumental Monterrey (Monterrey's main Bullfighting ring) and across the street from the Coca-Cola bottler.  Its logo represents the architecture of the station's entrance, and it is accessible for people with disabilities.

This station was inaugurated on October 31, 2007.  It was part of the first stage of the Line 2 expansion (along with Niños Heroes Station and Universidad), being the only underground station of the Line 2 extension project.

See also 
List of Monterrey metro stations

References 

Metrorrey stations
Railway stations opened in 2007
Railway stations located underground in Mexico